The 2023 season will be the Tennessee Titans' upcoming 54th season in the National Football League, their 64th overall, their 27th in the state of Tennessee and their sixth under head coach Mike Vrabel. The Titans will look to improve upon their 7-10 record from last year and make it back to the playoffs after missing them for the first time since 2018.

Offseason

Coaching changes
On January 9, 2023, the Titans fired offensive coordinator Todd Downing, offensive line coach Keith Carter, secondary coach Anthony Midget, and offensive skill assistant Erik Frazier. Under Downing in 2022, the Titans' offense was 30th in the league in yards and 28th in points-per-game. Fans had called for his firing since during the 2021 season, and many celebrated his departure. Carter's offensive line under his tenure was consistently ranked low, and Midget's secondary finished 2022 as worst in the league in passing yards. On February 7, passing game coordinator Tim Kelly was promoted to offensive coordinator, Charles London was hired as the quarterbacks coach from the Atlanta Falcons, and Chris Harris was hired as the defensive pass game coordinator/cornerbacks coach from the Washington Commanders. Lori Locust was hired from the Tampa Bay Buccaneers as the first full-time female coach in Titans history, alongside Justin Hamilton, as defensive quality control coaches. Jason Houghtaling was promoted to offensive line coach, Luke Steckel was moved to run game analyst, Pat O'Hara was moved to pass game analyst, and Tony Dews was moved to tight ends coach.

Organizational changes
On January 18, 2023, the Titans hired San Francisco 49ers executive Ran Carthon as their new general manager. The Titans had fired previous general manager Jon Robinson in December 2022 at the beginning of their seven-game losing streak.

Roster changes

Reserve/future free agent contracts

The Titans signed 11 players to futures contracts on January 10, 2023. By January 23, the Titans had signed  three additional players.

Draft

Staff

Current roster

Preseason
The Titans' preseason opponents and schedule will be announced in the spring.

Regular season

2023 opponents
Listed below are the Titans' opponents for 2023. Exact dates and times will be announced in the spring. The Titans will also host one of their games at Tottenham Hotspur Stadium in London as part of the NFL International Series.

References

External links
 

Tennessee
Tennessee Titans seasons
Tennessee Titans